Shri Lal Bahadur Shastri National Sanskrit University, formerly Shri Lal Bahadur Shastri Rashtriya Sanskrit Vidyapeetha, is a central university, located in New Delhi, India. It was established on 8 October 1962, and the University Grants Commission, granted the status of a deemed university to the Vidyapeetha in November 1987. In March 2020, the Indian Parliament passed the Central Sanskrit Universities Act, 2020 to upgrade it to central university status, along with two other universities Central Sanskrit University and National Sanskrit University.

Academics 
The university offers B.A., M.A, B.Ed, M.Ed, M.Phil and Ph.D courses, in Sanskrit and related subjects.

References

External links
Official website

Sanskrit universities in India
Universities in Delhi
Central universities in India
Educational institutions established in 1962
1962 establishments in Delhi
Memorials to Lal Bahadur Shastri